The following outline is provided as an overview of and topical guide to the U.S. state of New Mexico:

New Mexico – U.S. state located in the southwest region of the United States. It is the state with the highest percentage of Hispanics, including descendants of Spanish colonists and recent immigrants from Latin America. Congress admitted New Mexico to the Union as the 47th State on January 6, 1912.

General reference 

 Names
 Common name: New Mexico
 Pronunciation:
 Official name: State of New Mexico
 Abbreviations and name codes
 Postal symbol:  NM
 ISO 3166-2 code: US-NM
 Internet second-level domain: .nm.us
 Nicknames
 Land of Enchantment (currently used on license plates)
 Land of Sunshine (predates "Land of Enchantment"; this earlier nickname highlighted the large percentage of sunshine received statewide)
 The Outer Space State
 Adjectivals
 New Mexico
 New Mexican
 Demonym: New Mexican

Geography of New Mexico 

Geography of New Mexico
 New Mexico is: a U.S. state, a federal state of the United States of America
 Location
 Northern hemisphere
 Western hemisphere
 Americas
 North America
 Anglo America
 Northern America
 United States of America
 Contiguous United States
 Western United States
 Mountain West United States
 Southwestern United States
 Population of New Mexico: 2,059,179  (2010 U.S. Census)
 Area of New Mexico: 
 Atlas of New Mexico

Places in New Mexico 

 Historic places in New Mexico
 Ghost towns in New Mexico
 National Historic Landmarks in New Mexico
 National Register of Historic Places listings in New Mexico
 Bridges on the National Register of Historic Places in New Mexico
 National Natural Landmarks in New Mexico
 National parks in New Mexico
 State parks in New Mexico

Environment of New Mexico 

 Climate of New Mexico
 Climate change in New Mexico
 Superfund sites in New Mexico
 Wildlife of New Mexico
 Fauna of New Mexico
 Birds of New Mexico

Natural geographic features of New Mexico 

 Mountain ranges of New Mexico
 Rivers of New Mexico
 Valleys of New Mexico

Regions of New Mexico 

 Central New Mexico
 Eastern New Mexico
 Northern New Mexico
 Southern New Mexico
 Southwestern New Mexico

Administrative divisions of New Mexico 

 The 33 counties of the state of New Mexico
 Municipalities in New Mexico
 Cities in New Mexico
 State capital of New Mexico: Santa Fe
 Largest city in New Mexico: Albuquerque (34th-largest city in the U.S. As of June 2007)
 City nicknames in New Mexico

Demography of New Mexico 

Demographics of New Mexico

Government and politics of New Mexico 

Politics of New Mexico
 Form of government: U.S. state government
 United States congressional delegations from New Mexico
 New Mexico State Capitol
 Elections in New Mexico
 Electoral reform in New Mexico
 Political party strength in New Mexico

Branches of the government of New Mexico 

Government of New Mexico

Executive branch of the government of New Mexico 
 Governor of New Mexico
 Lieutenant Governor of New Mexico
 Secretary of State of New Mexico
 State departments
 New Mexico Department of Transportation

Legislative branch of the government of New Mexico 

 New Mexico Legislature (bicameral)
 Upper house: New Mexico Senate
 Lower house: New Mexico House of Representatives

Judicial branch of the government of New Mexico 

Courts of New Mexico
 Supreme Court of New Mexico

Law and order in New Mexico 

Law of New Mexico
 Cannabis in New Mexico
 Capital punishment in New Mexico
 Individuals executed in New Mexico
 Constitution of New Mexico
 Crime in New Mexico
 Gun laws in New Mexico
 Law enforcement in New Mexico
 Law enforcement agencies in New Mexico
 New Mexico State Police
 Same-sex marriage in New Mexico

Military in New Mexico 

 New Mexico Air National Guard
 New Mexico Army National Guard

History of New Mexico 

History of New Mexico

History of New Mexico, by period 
Prehistory of New Mexico
Puebloan peoples
Spanish exploration, 1541–1680
Spanish colony of Santa Fé de Nuevo Méjico, 1598–1821
Juan de Oñate Salazar founds San Juan de los Caballeros near Ohkay Owingeh Pueblo, 1598
Juan Martinez de Montoya founds La Villa Real de la Santa Fé de San Francisco de Asís (Santa Fé) near pueblo, 1608
Governor Pedro de Peralta moves capital from San Juan to Santa Fé, 1610
Village of Taos founded near Pueblo de Taos, 1617
Popé leads Pueblo Revolt, 1680–1692
Governor Diego de Vargas Zapata y Luján Ponce de León y Contreras leads Reconquesta, 1692
Governor Francisco Cuervo y Valdés founds Ranchos de Alburquerque (Albuquerque), 1706
Domínguez–Escalante expedition, 1776
United States presses territorial claims from Louisiana Purchase of 1803
Spanish cavalry arrests U.S. Army Pike Expedition, 1807
Adams–Onís Treaty of 1819
Mexican War of Independence, September 16, 1810 – August 24, 1821
Treaty of Córdoba, August 24, 1821
Mexican territory of Santa Fé de Nuevo México, 1821–1846
William Becknell opens Santa Fe Trail, 1821
Constitution of Mexico of 1824
Antonio Armijo opens Spanish Trail, 1829
Republic of Texas presses territorial claims, 1836–1845
Mexican Army arrests Texan Santa Fe Expedition, 1841
Revolt of 1837
Mexican–American War, April 25, 1846 – February 2, 1848
U.S. Military Province of New Mexico, 1846
Military Governor – General Stephen Watts Kearny, 1846
Siege of Pueblo de Taos, 1847
Treaty of Guadalupe Hidalgo, February 2, 1848
U.S. Provisional Government of New Mexico 1846–1850
State of Deseret (extralegal), 1849–1850
Proposed state of New Mexico, 1850
Compromise of 1850
Territory of New Mexico, 1850–1912
Gadsden Purchase of 1853
Long Walk to Bosque Redondo, 1860–1861
American Civil War, April 12, 1861 – May 13, 1865
New Mexico in the American Civil War, 1861–1865
Border territory, 1861–1865
New Mexico Campaign, 1862
Battle of Glorieta Pass, March 26–28, 1862
Confederate Territory of Arizona, 1861–1865
Comanche Campaign, 1868–1874
Spanish–American War, April 25 – August 12, 1898
State of New Mexico becomes 47th State admitted to the United States of America on January 6, 1912
World War I, June 28, 1914 – November 11, 1918
United States enters Great War on April 6, 1917
Carlsbad Caverns National Park established on May 14, 1930
World War II, September 1, 1939 – September 2, 1945
United States enters Second World War on December 8, 1941
Manhattan Engineering District, 1941–1946
Site Y (Los Alamos National Laboratory), since 1943
Z Division (Sandia National Laboratories), since 1945
Trinity Site (White Sands Missile Range), since 1945
Trinity Test, 1945-07-16

History of New Mexico, by region 

 By city
 History of Roswell, New Mexico
 History of Santa Fe, New Mexico

History of New Mexico, by subject 
 Territorial evolution of New Mexico
 Uranium mining in New Mexico

Culture of New Mexico 

Culture of New Mexico
 Cuisine of New Mexico
 Museums in New Mexico
 Religion in New Mexico
 Scouting in New Mexico
 State symbols of New Mexico
 Flag of the State of New Mexico 
 Great Seal of the State of New Mexico

The Arts in New Mexico 
 Music of New Mexico

Sports in New Mexico 

Sports in New Mexico

Economy and infrastructure of New Mexico 

Economy of New Mexico
 Communications in New Mexico
 Newspapers in New Mexico
 Radio stations in New Mexico
 Television stations in New Mexico
 Energy in New Mexico
 Power stations in New Mexico
 Solar power in New Mexico
 Wind power in New Mexico
 Uranium mining in New Mexico
 Health care in New Mexico
 Hospitals in New Mexico
 Transportation in New Mexico
 Airports in New Mexico

Education in New Mexico 

Education in New Mexico
 Schools in New Mexico
 School districts in New Mexico
 High schools in New Mexico
 Colleges and universities in New Mexico
 University of New Mexico
 New Mexico State University

See also

Topic overview:
New Mexico

Index of New Mexico-related articles

References

External links 

New Mexico
New Mexico
New Mexico